The Vidette (formerly The Daily Vidette) is a fully digital student-run news organization at Illinois State University. It is an affiliate of UWIRE, which distributes and promotes the paper's content to its network.

History
The Vidette was first published in 1888 and operated as a subscription publication until 1915 when it began receiving support through student fees. Publication frequency increased from weekly to semiweekly in 1934 before reverting to weekly publication in 1943. Through the 1960s and 1970s publication frequency eventually increased to five days per week. In 2013 and 2014 the newspaper reduced publication frequency to four and then two days per week. In August 2019, The Vidette became a weekly newspaper with a full-service website

Following the spring 2021 semester at Illinois State University, The Vidette will cease publishing a printed newspaper. However, it will continue as a digital news organization via its flagship website Videtteonline.com.

Operations
The Vidette covers international, national, state and local news as well as in-depth features and reviews and editorial opinions. In addition, the paper provides ISU students with professional work experience as journalists, graphic designers, web developers and media advertising sales representatives. It employs around 40 students each year and runs on a budget driven primarily through the university.
The Vidette currently garners total yearly pageviews between 500,000 and 1,000,000 on average. 
The Vidette formerly had a circulation of 4,000 issues a day on Tuesdays during the fall and spring semesters and a digital edition published four times during the summer. In addition to the daily issue, the newspaper staff also produced four special magazine sections throughout the year on a range of topics. The Vidette has 55 drop spots around the Bloomington-Normal area.

Online

The Vidette  website Videtteonline.com features student-generated content in a digital format, as well as multimedia content (videos, podcasts, photo galleries and blogs). The website also includes a full calendar of local events and some state and national news from Tribune News Service.

The Vidette is active on social media channels. Its Twitter account, @The_Vidette,  includes shares breaking news and other content. The Vidette also has a Facebook page, and Instagram account and a YouTube page.

All Vidette podcasts are available through SoundCloud Vidette Radio

Awards

The Vidette consistently produces award-winning editorial and advertising content. In February 2021, captured a record eight first-place awards in the annual Illinois College Press Association competition.

In February 2020, The Vidette won First Place in General Excellence (for contest year 2019) at the Illinois College Press Association convention, which recognizes student newspapers for outstanding work in all aspects of production. It was the second time in three years that The Vidette Staff captured First Place for General Excellence. Recently, it won three national advertising awards among college newspapers with a circulation under 30,000: In February 2021, The Vidette placed second in General Excellence, finishing behind The Daily Illini at the University of Illinois-Urbana Champaign.

Vidette Hall of Fame Members 
 2007:  Carl Hulse, Jeff Kraft, Kristen McQueary and Janelle Pettit.
 2009: Jay Blunk, Bill Gaspard, Todd Heisler, Heidi Voorhees, Harry Thiel and Mike Shelly.
 2011:  Ben Cordani, Tina Haisman, Marc Lebovitz and Bill Mulvihill.
 2014:  Ed Pyne, John Abrams, Alex Reside and Rick Jones
 2016:  Scott Gleeson, Jeff Knox, Jim Munz, Shannon Murphy and Chris Ruys
 2018: Tony Andracki, Bryan Bloodworth, Jim Kirk, Sally McKee and Mitch Pugh
 2020: Anna Frazier, Mick Hubert, Kevin Petschow and Jason Piscia (March 2020 induction event has been postponed to March 26, 2022 due to COVID-19 restrictions.)

References

1888 establishments in Illinois
Illinois State University
Newspapers published in Bloomington–Normal
Publications established in 1888
Student newspapers published in Illinois